Barret Spencer Oliver (born August 24, 1973) is an American photographer and a former child actor. He is best known for his role as Bastian Balthazar Bux in the film adaptation of Michael Ende's novel The Neverending Story, followed by roles in D.A.R.Y.L., Cocoon, and Cocoon: The Return.

Career
Oliver had minor roles in television and film, until starring as Bastian in the 1984 movie The NeverEnding Story. Subsequently, he was cast as the lead in Tim Burton's short film Frankenweenie and as the cyborg "Daryl" in the 1985 film D.A.R.Y.L., a part for which he won a Saturn Award.

His last role in a feature film was Willie Saravian in Paul Bartel's 1989 ensemble comedy Scenes from the Class Struggle in Beverly Hills.

Later Oliver became a printer and photographer, specializing in nineteenth-century processes such as collodion and Woodburytype. His work has been displayed in museum and gallery exhibitions and used in films. In 2007, his book A History of the Woodburytype was published by Carl Mautz Publishing.

Filmography

Film

Television

Awards and nominations

References

Bibliography
 Holmstrom, John. The Moving Picture Boy: An International Encyclopaedia from 1895 to 1995, Norwich, Michael Russell, 1996, pp. 393–394.

External links

Barret Oliver archive
Silverstein Photography Annual
HollyWood News Article (Archived)

1973 births
Living people
20th-century American male actors
American male child actors
American male film actors
American photographers
American male television actors
Male actors from Los Angeles